Entrepeñas may refer to:

Entrepeñas, Spain
Entrepeñas Reservoir, Spain